Kevin Ramsey (born September 5, 1961) is a former American football player and coach. Ramsey served as the interim head football coach at Texas Southern University in 2011 and the head football coach at Clark Atlanta University from 2015 to 2018.

Ramsey was born and raised in East St. Louis, Illinois. He attended Indiana State University, where he played college football as a defensive back from 1980 to 1983. He earned his bachelor's degree in education at Indiana State in 1984.

Charity work
Ramsey is an active member of the National Football League (NFL) minority internship program which helps new players get the extra help to excel in their positions. During his offseasons of being coach, Ramsey has helped teams, such as the Philadelphia Eagles, Chicago Bears, and the Green Bay Packers. In 2000, Ramsey helped ex-Washington Redskins and his organization "Winning Circle" which teaches character behavior to students in DeKalb County, Georgia.

Head coaching record

References

External links
 Texas Southern profile
 Arizona State profile

1961 births
Living people
American football defensive backs
Alabama State Hornets football coaches
Arizona Cardinals coaches
Arizona State Sun Devils football coaches
Carson–Newman Eagles football coaches
Clark Atlanta Panthers football coaches
Georgia Bulldogs football coaches
Indiana State Sycamores football players
Kansas State Wildcats football coaches
Michigan Wolverines football coaches
Northwestern Wildcats football coaches
Tennessee Volunteers football coaches
Texas Southern Tigers football coaches
West Virginia Mountaineers football coaches
High school football coaches in Arizona
High school football coaches in Texas
Sportspeople from East St. Louis, Illinois
Coaches of American football from Illinois
Players of American football from Illinois
African-American coaches of American football
African-American players of American football
20th-century African-American sportspeople
21st-century African-American sportspeople